John Joseph Ravannack (March 19, 1878 – October 10, 1910) was an American rower who competed in the 1904 Summer Olympics. He was born in Louisiana. In 1904 he won the bronze medal in the double sculls.

References

External links
profile 

1878 births
1910 deaths
American male rowers
Rowers at the 1904 Summer Olympics
Olympic bronze medalists for the United States in rowing
Medalists at the 1904 Summer Olympics